Aster amellus, the European Michaelmas daisy, is a perennial herbaceous plant in the genus Aster of the family Asteraceae.

Etymology
The specific name amellus is first used in the Georgics (Book IV, 271–280), a poem of the Latin poet Publius Vergilius Maro (70 BCE – 19 BCE), but the etymology is obscure and uncertain.

The English common name derives from the flowers being in bloom during Michaelmas (the Feast of St. Michael the archangel).

Description
The stem is erect and branched, the leaves are dark green. The basal leaves are obovate and petiolated, the cauline ones are  alternate and sessile, increasingly narrower and lanceolate. The flowers are lilac. The flowering period extends from July through October. The hermaphroditic flowers are either self-fertilized (autogamy) or pollinated by insects (entomogamy). The seeds are an achene that ripens in October.

Distribution
This plant is present on the European mountains from the Pyrenees and the Alps  to the Carpathians. Outside Europe it is located in western Asia (Turkey), the Caucasus, Siberia, South Asia (Uttarakhand, India) and Central Asia (Kazakhstan).

Cultivation
Asters are valued in the garden for late summer and autumn colour in shades of blue, pink and white. This species has several cultivars of ornamental garden use. The following have gained the Royal Horticultural Society's Award of Garden Merit:-
'Framfieldii'
'Jacqueline Genebrier'
'King George'
'Veilchenkönigin'
Aster × frikartii 'Mönch'

Habitat
The typical habitat is rocky limy areas, the edges of the bushes and copses, but also the sub-alpine meadows, marshy places and lake sides.

Synonyms

In literature

 was one of Letitia Elizabeth Landon's earliest published poems (1820).

Gallery

References

 Plants for a Future
 Pignatti S. - Flora d'Italia (3 vol.) - Edagricole – 1982, Vol. III, pag. 20

External links
 
 
 Zipcodezoo Database

amellus
Flora of Europe
Flora of the Pyrenees
Flora of the Alps
Flora of Azerbaijan
Flora of Central Asia
Flora of Siberia
Plants described in 1753
Taxa named by Carl Linnaeus